List of Olympic venues in hockey may refer to

 List of Olympic venues in ice hockey
 List of Olympic venues in field hockey